Hickory Grove, Illinois may refer to:
Hickory Grove, Adams County, Illinois, an unincorporated community in Adams County which is a suburb of Quincy
Hickory Grove, Carroll County, Illinois, an unincorporated community in Carroll County